Péter Botfa (born 30 June 1979) is a retired male hammer thrower from Hungary. He set his personal best (80.67 metres) on 14 June 2003 in Zalaegerszeg.

Achievements

References

Profile

1979 births
Living people
Hungarian male hammer throwers
Universiade medalists in athletics (track and field)
Universiade silver medalists for Hungary
Medalists at the 2003 Summer Universiade